Masayuki (written: , ,,  or ) is a masculine Japanese given name. Notable people with the name include:

, Japanese animator and director
, Japanese actor
, Japanese baseball player and manager
, Japanese politician
, Japanese samurai
, Japanese pianist and composer
, Japanese karateka
, Japanese daimyō
, Japanese handball player
, Japanese manga artist
, Japanese astronomer
, Japanese volleyball player
, Japanese voice actor
, Japanese speed skater
, Japanese physician
Masayuki Kawamura (golfer) (born 1967), Japanese golfer
, Japanese seismologist
, Japanese swimmer
, Japanese animator and anime director
, Japanese professional wrestler and mixed martial artist
, Japanese footballer
, Japanese sport wrestler
, Japanese gymnast
, Japanese volleyball player
, Japanese footballer
, Japanese anime director
, Japanese artist
, Japanese sumo wrestler
, Japanese actor
, Japanese film producer
, Japanese sculptor
, Japanese footballer
, Japanese politician
, Japanese professional wrestler
, Japanese film director
, Japanese footballer
, Japanese footballer
, Japanese footballer
, Japanese footballer
, Japanese footballer
, Japanese swimmer
, Japanese footballer
, Japanese anime director
, Japanese daimyō
, Japanese fencer
, Japanese film director
, Japanese singer
, Japanese drummer
, Japanese film producer
, Japanese sailor
, Japanese musician
, Japanese singer
, Japanese politician
, Japanese sumo wrestler
Masayuki Tokioka (18971998), Japanese businessman
, Japanese shogi player
, Japanese video game hardware designer
, Japanese footballer
, Japanese footballer
, Japanese astronomer

See also
8206 Masayuki, a main-belt asteroid

Japanese masculine given names